Saro, the most powerful statelet of the Jinhan confederacy, conquered each of the other statelets and later became Silla.

The result of conquest war, Jinhan was completely annexed to Silla in the late 3rd century. However, some states absorbed in Gaya confederacy.

Timeline 
37? : Iseoguk 이서국 (presumed near Cheongdo)
79? : U-si 우시산국 (present-day Ulsan) and Kueo-ch’il 거칠산국 (present-day Busan)

1st part

Northwards 
 102 : Eumjipbeol 음즙벌국 (present-day northern Gyeongju)
 104 : Siljikgok 실직곡국 (present-day Samcheok)

Southwards 
 102 : Apdok 압독국 (present-day Gyeongsan)
 108 : Biji 비지국 (present-day Hapcheon)  and  Chopal 초팔국 (present-day Changwon) 
 108 : Dabeol 다벌국  (present-day Daegu)

2nd part 
 185 : Somun 소문국 near Uiseong
 231 : Gammun 감문국 near Gimcheon
 236 : Golbeol 골벌국 near Yeongcheon
 247-261 : Saryangbeol 사량벌국 near Sangju

References

External links
 Map of the Silla-Gaya-Paekche Wars

Gaya confederacy
Silla
Wars involving Silla